Terrance Hanold (1912–1996) was an American attorney, food industry executive, and President of the Pillsbury Company.

Hanold was an orphan from the age of four after his parents died in an unknown fire. He was then adopted and moved to a farm family in Illinois where descendants still live to this day as cattle farmers. Hanold was a graduate of the University of Minnesota, the University of Minnesota Law School, and married to Ruth E. Hanold.  Upon becoming Pillsbury President in 1967, Hanold diversified the management structure of the company.  He travelled the United States to tend to the large Pillsbury operation.  He also practiced law in Minnesota and left his papers to the University of Minnesota archives.

References

Minnesota lawyers
University of Minnesota Law School alumni
1912 births
1996 deaths
American food industry businesspeople
20th-century American lawyers